Thestus philippensis is a species of beetle in the family Cerambycidae. It was described by Bernhard Schwarzer in 1929. It is known from the Philippines.

References

Lamiini
Beetles described in 1929